Geoffrey Lazer Ramsey (born Geoffrey Paul Wright, later Geoffrey Paul Fink on June 19, 1975) is an American voice actor, film producer and internet personality. He co-founded the production company Rooster Teeth and is known for voicing Dexter Grif in the web series Red vs. Blue. He also co-founded Achievement Hunter, a gaming division of Rooster Teeth.

Early life
Ramsey was born and grew up primarily in the Mobile, Alabama area, where he attended elementary and high school, but also lived in Pensacola and Jacksonville, Florida, and the outlying areas of New Orleans. He was a Semi-professional bowler in his teen years, and enlisted into the United States Army before graduating high school, beginning basic training at Fort Jackson in South Carolina shortly afterwards. His service lasted from 1993 to 1998, though he went on to serve as a photojournalist in Kuwait; he was based at Fort Hood during that time. He studied journalism at Fort Benjamin Harrison.

After his military service, Ramsey worked as a roadie for the band Catch 22 and as a production assistant for View Askew Productions. Ramsey then secured a job at the tech support company teleNetwork, where he met Burnie Burns and Gus Sorola. Prior to working for Rooster Teeth, he also co-created the web site drunkgamers.com with Sorola, hiring Burns shortly afterwards to run the site.

Rooster Teeth

Ramsey is one of the original voice actors for Rooster Teeth's sci-fi comedy machinima series Red vs. Blue (2003–present) as the voice of Dexter Grif.  Since then, he has gone on to become an Internet celebrity, regularly appearing at conventions such as PAX and Com Blue with Red vs. Blue actors Burnie Burns, Gus Sorola and Joel Heyman on the Rooster Teeth Podcast. He has only appeared on the podcast sporadically since September 2011, but was one of the hosts on a November 2014 episode of The Patch, Rooster Teeth's gaming podcast. Ramsey's other work with Rooster Teeth includes voicing The Omnipotent Voice in the machinima series The Strangerhood (2004–2006), playing a fictionalized version of himself in both Captain Dynamic (2008) and Rooster Teeth Shorts (2009–present), being a "lab rat" in Immersion (2010), and voicing the Corpirate, the primary antagonist of the first season of the animated series X-Ray and Vav (2014).

In 2008, Ramsey started Achievement Hunter with his colleague Jack Pattillo, a department of Rooster Teeth Productions centered largely on video games. The site originally focused on making videos of achievement guides and Easter eggs found in video games, but has since moved its primary focus to comedic "Let's Play" videos, wherein they play video games and provide humorous commentary, as well as other game-related videos and live-action content featuring the same personalities.

Additionally, he appeared in the bi-weekly reality series Happy Hour alongside his friend and coworker Gavin Free and his second wife Griffon Ramsey. In June 2018, Rooster Teeth launched its first pop-up store in Los Angeles featuring a collection of shirts, hoodies, bags, and pins designed by Ramsey. On September 23, 2019, it was announced that Ramsey had been appointed executive creative director of Rooster Teeth.

Personal life
While changing his surname to his stepfather's, "Ramsey", he was informed by the court that it would not cost any more to change any of his other names, so he jokingly changed his middle name to "Lazer".

Ramsey married his second wife, Griffon Ramsey, in 2005. They have a daughter named Millicent. In November 2017, Griffon confirmed on Twitter that the two were in the process of a divorce. Geoff announced the following April that he was divorced in a video on the Let's Play channel on YouTube.

Filmography

Film

Web

Video games

References

External links

 
 Geoff Ramsey's profile on the Rooster Teeth website

1975 births
Living people
21st-century American male actors
21st-century American screenwriters
Actors from Mobile, Alabama
American male voice actors
American male web series actors
American YouTubers
Male actors from Austin, Texas
Rooster Teeth people
Screenwriters from Alabama
Screenwriters from Texas
United States Army soldiers